In aviation, a flight information region (FIR) is a specified region of airspace in which a flight information service and an alerting service (ALRS) are provided. The International Civil Aviation Organization (ICAO) delegates which country is responsible for the operational control of a given FIR. FIRs are the largest regular division of airspace in use in the world today, and have existed at least since 1947.

Smaller countries' airspace is encompassed by a single FIR; larger countries' airspace is subdivided into a number of regional FIRs.

Some FIRs encompass the territorial airspace of several countries.  Oceanic airspace is divided into oceanic information regions and delegated to a controlling authority bordering that region. The division among authorities is done by international agreement through the International Civil Aviation Organization (ICAO).

There is no standard size for FIRs–some are merely vertical extensions of their respective countries, however small they may be, while others may extend far into the open ocean–it is a matter for the administrative convenience of the country concerned. In some cases there is a vertical division of the FIR, in which case the lower portion remains named as such, whereas the airspace above is termed an upper information region (UIR).

A flight information service and an alerting service are the basic levels of air traffic service, providing information pertinent to the safe and efficient conduct of flights and alerting the different relevant authorities should an aircraft be in distress. These are available to all aircraft through an FIR. Higher levels of air traffic advisory and control services may be available within certain portions of airspace within an FIR, according to the ICAO class of that portion of airspace (with regard to national regulations), and the existence of a suitably equipped authority to provide the services.

List of flight information regions

The following table lists flight information regions alphabetically according to their ICAO code.

See also
 Area control center
 Air corridor
 Air defense identification zone
 Airspace
 Air traffic control
 Airway (aviation)
 Control area (aviation)
 Control zone
 List of area control centers
 Terminal control area

References 
 Citations

External links 
 ICAO Aviation Data Service  (official site)
 ICAO World Airport and Runway Map (official site)

Air traffic control
International law